The  was an army of the Imperial Japanese Army during World War II.

History
The  was formed on September 9, 1942 under the Southern Expeditionary Army Group following the Japanese invasion and occupation of French Indochina.

On November 12, 1944, with the threat of possible landings of Allied forces to retake French Indochina increasing, the organizational structure of the Southern Expeditionary Army changed, and the Indochina Garrison Army was re-designated the Japanese Thirty-Eighth Army. It remained stationed in French Indochina as a garrison force as before.

The Japanese 38th Army was involved in the Meigo Sakusen (Operation Bright Moon) of March 1945, which resulted in the proclamation of the Empire of Vietnam independent from French rule.

The Japanese 38th Army was demobilized at the surrender of Japan on August 15, 1945 at Hanoi.

List of commanders

Commanding officer

Chief of Staff

References

Books

External links
 
 

Military units and formations disestablished in 1945
38
Military units and formations established in 1942
1944 in Vietnam
1945 in Vietnam